Lindsay Kay Hayward (born July 28, 1987) is an American actress and retired professional wrestler better known by her ring names, Isis the Amazon and Aloisia (her WWE name). In 2013, Guinness World Records certified her as being the "tallest actress in a leading role", originally standing 6 foot 9, she had lost 3/4 inches in height due to a slipped disc.

Background
Born in Walnut Creek, California, she played for the Rocklin Thunder at Rocklin High School in Rocklin, California. She played basketball for Forest Lake Christian High School and helped her team win the sectional championship. Her mother is named Ellen Roney and she has a sister named Tabitha.

Wrestling history
On April 17, 2008, ICWMiami found Isis the Amazon while hosting events at the Exxxotica Convention. She was introduced to “Soulman” Alex G, who became her trainer. For the following few months, she began to valet ICW Tag Team Champions, Dade County Collision.
In 2008, she challenged Tracy Taylor for the Professional Girl Wrestling Association championship
She competed for Coastal Championship Wrestling from 2008 to 2009
She competed for Rampage Pro Wrestling in 2009.
She competed for Juggalo Championship Wrestling from 2009 to 2010.
In 2010, she was scheduled to appear as "Aloisia" on season 3 of WWE NXT. She was going to be the tallest Diva ever to compete in the company's history. She was trained by Soulman Alex G and took part in seminars with Jimmy Snuka and was managed by Vickie Guerrero until being replaced by Kaitlyn. She was released a few weeks after her signing after WWE discovered "erotic photos" taken of her online.
In 2011, she competed in Absolute Intense Wrestling in January, Total Nonstop Action Wrestling in February, and the National Wrestling Alliance Signature Pro Wrestling in May.
In 2016, she started training with Brian Kendrick for a potential return to professional wrestling.

Acting history
In 2013, she played a 7-foot-tall CEO in R100
In 2014, she played Katja in The Internship Games.
In 2015 Grey's Anatomy Season 12 Episode 2 she guest starred as Jade Bell
In 2015, she played Cassie in Rumors
In 2016, she starred in You Have a Nice Flight.

Other appearances
Lindsay Hayward appeared as herself in the TLC mini-series My Giant Life, where the show concentrated on her reuniting with her father and her difficulties doing normal things, like clothes shopping, flying in a plane, or getting acting jobs. During season 2 of My Giant Life, Hayward stated that she would eventually return to professional wrestling and she also said that she hopes to perform at WrestleMania one day.

Personal life
On June 28, 2015, she announced on her Facebook page that she is in a relationship. Her son Liam was born on September 12, 2017.

References

External links
 Facebook Profile
 Twitter Profile
 Instagram Profile
 IMDb Pro Profile
Profile on CageMatch

1987 births
Living people
21st-century American actresses
21st-century professional wrestlers
Actresses from California
American female professional wrestlers
American film actresses
American television actresses
Native American professional wrestlers
Professional wrestlers from California
People from Walnut Creek, California